Tashdeh (also Romanized as Tāshdeh; also known as Tāshteh) is a village in Kuhsarat Rural District, in the Central District of Minudasht County, Golestan Province, Iran. At the 2006 census, its population was 309, in 79 families.

References 

Populated places in Minudasht County